Ngoma is a Congolese and Zambian surname. Notable people with the name include:
 Angélique Ngoma, Gabonese politician
 Arthur Z'ahidi Ngoma (1947–2016), Congolese politician
 Aubrey Ngoma (1989), South African football player
 Becky Ngoma, Zambian actress and writer
 Brighton Ngoma (1985), South African actor
 Etienne Kassa-Ngoma (1962), Gabonese footballer
 Fred Duval Ngoma (1997), Republic of the Congo football midfielder 
 Georges Ngoma-Nanitélamio (1978), Congolese footballer
 Leonard Ngoma (1979), Zambian former swimmer
 Nompumelelo Ngoma (1984), South African visual artist and printmaker
 Patrick Ngoma (1997), Zambian association football forward
 Serge Ngoma (2005), American soccer player

References 

Kongo-language surnames
Zambian surnames
Tumbuka-Senga-language surnames
Surnames of Congolese origin